Bobby Jeffrey (born 7 November 1942) is a Scottish former professional footballer who played as a left winger

Career
Born in Airdrie, Jeffrey played for Coltness United, Celtic, Airdrie, Rhyl, Altrincham, Pwllheli, Colwyn Bay, Cambridge City and Stranraer.

References

1942 births
Living people
Scottish footballers
Newmains United Community F.C. players
Celtic F.C. players
Airdrieonians F.C. (1878) players
Rhyl F.C. players
Altrincham F.C. players
Pwllheli F.C. players
Colwyn Bay F.C. players
Cambridge City F.C. players
Stranraer F.C. players
Scottish Football League players
Association football wingers
Scotland under-23 international footballers